The University of Alberta Hospital (UAH) is a research and teaching hospital in Edmonton, Alberta, Canada. The hospital is affiliated with the University of Alberta and run by Alberta Health Services, the health authority for Alberta. It is one of Canada's leading health sciences centres, providing a comprehensive range of diagnostic and treatment services to inpatients and outpatients. The UAH treats over 700,000 patients annually.

The University of Alberta Hospital, Mazankowski Alberta Heart Institute and the Stollery Children's Hospital co-reside within the large Walter C. Mackenzie Health Sciences Centre (WMC) and act as embedded "hospitals within a hospital." With 650, 146 and 89 inpatient beds in the three hospitals, respectively, WMC has an estimated total of 885 beds. Combined, this makes the Walter C. Mackenzie Health Sciences Centre one of the largest hospitals in Western Canada, exceeding the Royal Alexandra Hospital's 869 beds, but behind Calgary's Foothills Medical Centre. The Mazankowski Alberta Heart Institute is located in a new expansion to the WMC that opened on May 1, 2008.

Because of UAH, the surrounding area has become part of a healthcare cluster that also includes the Cross Cancer Institute, the Heritage Medical Research Building, the Zeidler Ledcor Center, the Katz Group/Rexall Center for Pharmacy and Health Research, the Kaye Edmonton Clinic, and the Edmonton Clinic Health Academy.

The whole complex is served by the Health Sciences/Jubilee light rail transit station and the University station.

History

The University of Alberta Hospital opened in 1906 with five staff members as the Strathcona Hospital.  Since then, it has steadily grown into a world class facility which now is staffed by over 8,000 staff and physicians (as of 2007).

The hospital began training nurses through a recognized apprenticeship program in 1908. In 1916 during World War I it served as the Strathcona Military Hospital. It was the provincial rehabilitation centre for the polio epidemics in the 1920s and 1950s. Dr. Hepburn, a pioneering neurosurgeon, developed "The Edmonton Tongs" as initial treatment for cervical spine injuries in the late 1920s. Dr. John Callaghan performed Canada's first open-heart surgery here in 1956, and the first heart valve replacement six years later in 1962. The first heart transplant in Western Canada was performed at the hospital in 1985, and by 2001 the hospital had conducted 500 heart and heart-lung transplants. In 2001 the Stollery Children's Hospital opened. In 2006, the hospital had the most technically advanced and only intensive care unit dedicated solely to the treatment of burn patients.

Stollery Children's Hospital
The Stollery Children's Hospital is a 150 bed children's hospital that opened in October 2001. It is a hospital within a hospital, being situated within the University of Alberta Hospital.

The hospital, which is run by Alberta Health Services, is named for Bob and Shirley Stollery who provided the original donation that went to help with the creation of the hospital.

Library
 

The John W. Scott Health Sciences Library was opened in 1984, and was named after the Dean of Medicine from 1948 to 1959.
The University of Alberta Libraries is a member of the Association of Research Libraries, Canadian Association of Research Libraries, and is a contributor to the Open Content Alliance

Specialized services

Cardiac care
The University of Alberta Hospital's cardiac sciences program includes adult and pediatric cardiology and heart surgery. The program also does research in vascular biology and electrophysiology. The University of Alberta Hospital is the pioneering hospital for open-heart surgery in Canada.

Transplant program
The University Hospital's transplant program is claimed to be recognized as one of the best in Canada and the world. It has been ranked #6 worldwide in 2017 by CWUR. It is touted as a leader in both the numbers of transplant procedures performed and success rates. At the hospital, patients can receive heart, lung, liver, kidney, pancreas, intestinal and islet cell transplants.

The University Hospital's Mazankowski Alberta Heart Institute is the largest heart transplant program in Canada. It is the centre for all open-heart surgery for Edmonton & Northern Alberta, and the centre for all complex pediatric cardiac surgery for Western & Northern Canada. The institute performs more than 1,300 open-heart surgeries annually.

The University of Alberta Hospital is home to the most comprehensive organ and tissue transplant program in Canada - providing gold standard care to more than eight million Canadians across Alberta, Saskatchewan, British Columbia, Manitoba, Nunavut, the Yukon and the Northwest Territories. No other program offers the complete range of transplant procedures — heart, kidney, liver, lung, heart/lung, small bowel, pancreas, islet, eye and tissue.

The University of Alberta Hospital is home to the largest islet transplant program in the world, and the birthplace of the Edmonton Protocol, a revolutionary procedure for conducting islet transplants on patients with Type 1 diabetes.

Neuroscience
The University of Alberta Hospital contains a dedicated neurosciences intensive care environment. This area is dedicated to the treatment of complex conditions such as strokes, brain tumours, as well as spinal cord and brain injuries. An inter-disciplinary team uses state-of-the-art technology to coordinate the treatment of these conditions.

Burn treatment
The University of Alberta Hospital receives patients from all over Western Canada in the Fire Fighter's Burn Treatment Unit. This is one of the most technologically advanced and highly acclaimed burn care units in the world. A multidisciplinary team that includes nurses, physicians and physical, respiratory, and occupational therapists provide care for burn patients.

References

1906 establishments in Alberta
Certified airports in Alberta
Edmonton Metropolitan Region
Heliports in Canada
Hospitals established in 1906
Hospitals in Edmonton
Teaching hospitals in Canada
University of Alberta buildings